The 2018 United States state legislative elections were held on November 6, 2018 for 87 state legislative chambers in 46 states. Across the fifty states, approximately 56 percent of all upper house seats and 92 percent of all lower house seats were up for election. Additionally, six territorial chambers in four territories and the District of Columbia were up as well. 

Democrats flipped at least 350 state legislative seats, picking up most of those seats in states where President Trump's approval rating was relatively low. Six chambers—the Colorado Senate, New Hampshire House, New Hampshire Senate, Minnesota House, Maine Senate and New York State Senate—flipped from Republican to Democratic control. Additionally the Connecticut Senate went from being evenly divided to a Democratic majority. Democrats also broke Republican legislative supermajorities in North Carolina, Michigan and Pennsylvania and gained a legislative supermajority in both houses of the California, Illinois and Oregon legislatures.

Summary table

Regularly-scheduled elections were held in 87 of the 99 state legislative chambers in the United States; nationwide, regularly-scheduled elections were held for 6,064 of the 7,383 legislative seats. Most legislative chambers held elections for all seats, but some legislative chambers that use staggered elections held elections for only a portion of the total seats in the chamber. The chambers that were not up for election either hold regularly-scheduled elections in odd-numbered years, or have four-year terms and hold all regularly-scheduled elections in presidential election years.

Note that this table only covers regularly-scheduled elections; additional special elections took place concurrently with these regularly-scheduled elections.

|- align=center
! colspan="2"  style="background:#e9e9e9; text-align:center;"|Political Party
! style="background:#e9e9e9;"|Previous total
! style="background:#e9e9e9;"|New total
! style="background:#e9e9e9;"|Net change
|-
| 
|4,073||3,813||-260
|-
| 
|3,120||3,433||+313
|-
| 
|22||23||+1
|}

State summaries

Alabama

All members of the Alabama Senate and the Alabama House of Representatives were up for election in 2018. Republicans retained control of both chambers.

Alaska

Half of the seats of the Alaska Senate and all of the seats of the Alaska House of Representatives were up for election in 2018. Republicans retained control of the senate, while a cross-partisan coalition of Democrats, Republicans, and independents retained control of the house of representatives.

Arizona

All of the seats of the Arizona Senate and the Arizona House of Representatives were up for election in 2018. Republicans retained control of both chambers, but lost four seats in the House and lost the popular vote in the Senate by 1.4 points.

Arkansas

Half of the seats of the Arkansas Senate and all of the seats of the Arkansas House of Representatives were up for election in 2018. Republicans retained control of both chambers.

California

Half of the seats of the California State Senate and all of the seats of the California State Assembly were up for election in 2018. Democrats retained control of both chambers.

Colorado

Half of the seats of the Colorado Senate and all of the seats of the Colorado House of Representatives were up for election in 2018. Democrats won control of the senate and retained control of the house of representatives.

Connecticut

All of the seats of the Connecticut State Senate and the Connecticut House of Representatives were up for election in 2018. Democrats won control of the senate and retained control of the house of representatives.

Delaware

Half of the seats of the Delaware Senate and all of the seats of the Delaware House of Representatives were up for election in 2018. Democrats retained control of both chambers.

Florida

Half of the seats of the Florida Senate and all of the seats of the Florida House of Representatives were up for election in 2018. Republicans retained control of both chambers.

Georgia

All of the seats of the Georgia State Senate and the Georgia House of Representatives were up for election in 2018. Republicans retained control of both chambers.

Hawaii

Half of the seats of the Hawaii Senate and all of the seats of the Hawaii House of Representatives were up for election in 2018. Democrats retained control of both chambers.

Idaho

All of the seats of the Idaho Senate and the Idaho House of Representatives were up for election in 2018. Republicans retained control of both chambers.

Illinois

Two thirds of the seats of the Illinois Senate and all of the seats of the Illinois House of Representatives were up for election in 2018. Democrats retained control of both chambers.

Indiana

Half of the seats of the Indiana Senate and all of the seats of the Indiana House of Representatives were up for election in 2018. Republicans retained control of both chambers.

Iowa

Half of the seats of the Iowa Senate and all of the seats of the Iowa House of Representatives were up for election in 2018. Republicans retained control of both chambers.

Kansas

All of the seats of the Kansas House of Representatives were up for election in 2018; the Republican-controlled Kansas Senate did not hold regularly-scheduled elections in 2018. Republicans retained control of the house of representatives.

Kentucky

Half of the seats of the Kentucky Senate and all of the seats of the Kentucky House of Representatives were up for election in 2018. Republicans retained control of both chambers.

Maine

All of the seats of the Maine Senate and the Maine House of Representatives were up for election in 2018. Democrats gained control of the state senate and retained control of the house of representatives.

Maryland

All of the seats of the Maryland Senate and the Maryland House of Delegates were up for election in 2018. Democrats retained control of both chambers.

Massachusetts

All of the seats of the Massachusetts Senate and the Massachusetts House of Representatives were up for election in 2018. Democrats control both chambers, and the governor is a member of the Republican Party. Democrats hold a veto-proof supermajority in the state legislature.

Michigan

All of the seats of the Michigan Senate and the Michigan House of Representatives were up for election in 2018. Republicans retained control of both chambers, but Democrats picked up enough seats to break the Republican legislative supermajority.

Minnesota

All of the seats of the Minnesota House of Representatives were up for election in 2018; the Republican-controlled Minnesota Senate did not hold regularly-scheduled elections in 2018. Democrats won control of the house of representatives, making Minnesota is the only state in the country where each major party controlled one state legislative chamber.

Missouri

Half of the seats of the Missouri Senate and all of the seats of the Missouri House of Representatives were up for election in 2018. Republicans retained control of both chambers.

Montana

Half of the seats of the Montana Senate and all of the seats of the Montana House of Representatives were up for election in 2018. Republicans retained control of both chambers.

Nebraska

Nebraska is the only U.S. state with a unicameral legislature; half of the seats of the Nebraska Legislature were up for election in 2018. Nebraska is also unique in that its legislature is officially non-partisan and holds non-partisan elections, although the Democratic and Republican parties each endorse legislative candidates.

Nevada

Half of the seats of the Nevada Senate and all of the seats of the Nevada Assembly were up for election in 2018. Democrats retained control of both chambers.

New Hampshire

All of the seats of the New Hampshire Senate and the New Hampshire House of Representatives were up for election in 2018. Democrats won control of both chambers.

New Mexico

All of the seats of the New Mexico House of Representatives were up for election in 2018; the Democratic-controlled New Mexico Senate did not hold regularly-scheduled elections in 2018. Democrats retained control of the house of representatives.

New York

All of the seats of the New York State Senate and the New York State Assembly were up for election in 2018. Democrats won control of the state senate and retained control of the state assembly.

North Carolina

All of the seats of the North Carolina Senate and the North Carolina House of Representatives were up for election in 2018. Republicans retained control of both chambers, but Democrats won enough seats to break the Republican legislative super-majority.

North Dakota

Half of the seats of the North Dakota Senate and the North Dakota House of Representatives were up for election in 2018. Republicans retained control of both chambers.

Ohio

Half of the seats of the Ohio Senate and all of the seats of the Ohio House of Representatives were up for election in 2018. Republicans retained control of both chambers.

Oklahoma

Half of the seats of the Oklahoma Senate and all of the seats of the Oklahoma House of Representatives were up for election in 2018. Republicans retained control of both chambers.

Oregon

Half of the seats of the Oregon State Senate and all of the seats of the Oregon House of Representatives were up for election in 2018. Democrats retained control of both chambers.

Pennsylvania

Half of the seats of the Pennsylvania State Senate and all of the seats of the Pennsylvania House of Representatives were up for election in 2018. Republicans retained control of both chambers, but Democrats picked up enough seats to break the Republican legislative supermajority.

Rhode Island

All of the seats of the Rhode Island Senate and the Rhode Island House of Representatives were up for election in 2018. Democrats retained control of both chambers.

South Carolina

All of the seats of the South Carolina House of Representatives were up for election in 2018; the Republican-controlled South Carolina Senate did not hold regularly-scheduled elections in 2018. Republicans retained control of the house of representatives.

South Dakota

All of the seats of the South Dakota Senate and the South Dakota House of Representatives were up for election in 2018. Republicans retained control of both chambers.

Tennessee

Half of the seats of the Tennessee Senate and all of the seats of the Tennessee House of Representatives were up for election in 2018. Republicans retained control of both chambers.

Texas

Half of the seats of the Texas Senate and all of the seats of the Texas House of Representatives were up for election in 2018. Republicans retained control of both chambers.

Utah

Half of the seats of the Utah State Senate and all of the seats of the Utah House of Representatives were up for election in 2018. Republicans retained control of both chambers.

Vermont

All of the seats of the Vermont Senate and the Vermont House of Representatives were up for election in 2018. Democrats retained control of both chambers.

Washington

Half of the seats of the Washington State Senate and all of the seats of the Washington House of Representatives were up for election in 2018. Democrats retained control of both chambers.

West Virginia

Half of the seats of the West Virginia Senate and all of the seats of the West Virginia House of Delegates were up for election in 2018. Republicans retained control of both chambers.

Wisconsin

Half of the seats of the Wisconsin State Senate and all of the seats of the Wisconsin State Assembly were up for election in 2018. Republicans retained control of both chambers.

Wyoming

Half of the seats of the Wyoming Senate and all of the seats of the Wyoming House of Representatives were up for election in 2018. Republicans retained control of both chambers.

Territorial and federal district summaries

American Samoa
All of the seats of the American Samoa House of Representatives were up for election. Members of the House of Representatives serve two-year terms. Gubernatorial and legislative elections are conducted on a nonpartisan basis in American Samoa.

Guam
All of the seats of the unicameral Legislature of Guam were up for election. All members of the legislature serve a two-year term. Democrats retained control of the legislature.

Northern Mariana Islands
A portion of the seats of the Northern Mariana Islands Senate, and all of the seats of the Northern Mariana Islands House of Representatives, were up for election. Members of the senate serve either four-year terms, while members of the house serve two-year terms. Republicans maintained control of both chambers.

U.S. Virgin Islands
All of the seats of the unicameral Legislature of the Virgin Islands were up for election. All members of the legislature serve a two-year term. Democrats retained control of the legislature.

Washington, D.C.

The Council of the District of Columbia serves as the legislative branch of the federal district of Washington, D.C. Half of the council seats are up for election. Council members serve four-year terms. Democrats retained supermajority control of the council.

Special elections 
Various states will hold special elections for legislative districts throughout the year.

Alabama

New Jersey

Notes

References

 
State legislative elections
State legislature elections in the United States by year